John McGarry is a former guard in the National Football League.

McGarry was born John Thomas McGarry on November 24, 1963, in Chicago, Illinois. He played with the Green Bay Packers during the 1987 NFL season. He played at the collegiate level at Saint Joseph's College.

See also
List of Green Bay Packers players

References

1963 births
Living people
Players of American football from Chicago
Green Bay Packers players
American football offensive guards
Saint Joseph's Pumas football players